Lake Tarnobrzeg, Machowski Reservoir or Lake Machów is an artificial lake created in a former sulfur mine in Machów, Tarnobrzeg, Poland.

History
The lake was opened in 2010 after 16 years of construction and landscaping. The re-cultivation work began in the old mine in 1994. The total cost of changing post the industrial area into lake totaled 1.5 billion PLN. The project was paid for by the State Treasury.

Re-name 
In 2011 the Tarnobrzeg City Council, together with the Mayor of Tarnobrzeg, interpellated with the Polish Ministry of the Interior and Administration to change the official name to Lake Tarnobrzeg.

References

External links 
Tarnobrzeg Town Television film about Machów

Tarnobrzeg
Tarbobrzeg
Tarnobrzeg